Khajurla  is a village in Phagwara tehsil in Kapurthala district of Punjab State, India. The village is administrated by a Sarpanch who is an elected representative.

Transport
Jalandhar Cantonment and Chiheru are the nearest railway stations to Khajurla; Jalandhar City railway station is 11 km away.  The village is 107 km from Sri Guru Ram Dass Jee International Airport in Amritsar and the another nearest airport is Sahnewal Airport  in Ludhiana which is located 49 km away from the village.  Phagwara, Jandiala , Jalandhar , Kartarpur are the nearby cities.

References

External links
  Villages in Kapurthala
 Kapurthala Villages List

Villages in Kapurthala district